Peter Cusack may refer to:

Peter Cusack (musician), British musician
Peter Cusack (rugby league) (born 1977), Australian rugby league footballer